Nazanin Aliza Mandighomi Pimentel (born  September 11, 1986), known professionally as Nazanin Mandi, is an American actress, singer, model, and life coach.

Early life 
Nazanin Mandi was born on September 11, 1986, in Valencia, California. She is of Iranian, Mexican and Native American descent.

Mandi began her modeling career at the age of 10, after being scouted by a photographer at an In-N-Out Burger. At age 15, Mandi performed Mozart's Requiem, K.626 at Carnegie Hall in New York City. During this time, Mandi attended Valencia High School, where she studied jazz and classical music as a soloist in the institution's VHS Choir. Mandi graduated from Valencia High in June 2004.

Career

Modeling and fashion
Mandi was signed to Wilhelmina Models in Los Angeles. She has modeled in print and digital editorials for Vogue, MAXIM, GQ India, Esquire Malaysia, COMPLEX, WMB 3D, Modeliste, Bella Petite, TOKSICK, Galore, Allure, CosmoGirl, Sports Illustrated, and Seventeen. Her ad campaigns include Microsoft, Ecko Unlimited, Good American, Olay, Shiseido, PrettyLittleThing, Missguided, Savage X Fenty, CoverGirl, and Smashbox Cosmetics.

On March 25, 2017, Mandi launched a collaborative collection with swimwear line, Chynna Dolls.

Acting and music
After seeing an ad on Fox Eleven News, Mandi's mother encouraged her to audition for the inaugural season of the music competition series American Idol. At the age of 15, she made it to the top 35 before being kicked off for not meeting the minimum age requirement of 16. Three years later, Mandi made her acting debut with a guest appearance on the Disney Channel television series That's So Raven. In 2005, she auditioned and competed on the UPN talent competition show R U The Girl. Vying for the opportunity to sing with TLC, Mandi made it to the top nine before being eliminated during the group performance round. Following a few stints in reality television—e.g., Shahs of Sunset, The Platinum Life—and a couple guest star roles—i.e., The Young and the Restless, Twenties—Mandi made her film debut in the 2020 romantic comedy The Last Conception. The film tells the story of an Indian-American lesbian who discovers she is the last hope of continuing her family's ancient bloodline. Mandi is also set to star in the  2021 horror film Dreamcatcher, produced by Samuel Goldwyn Films.

On July 25, 2019, Mandi released her debut single, "FOREVER MOOD", via Billboard. The track was produced by Siviwe "The Code" Mngaza, and co-executive produced by Midian Mathers and her husband, Miguel.

Endorsements 
In 2018, Nazanin became a brand ambassador for fashion retailer, PrettyLittleThing. Two years later, she became an ambassador for online fashion label, Missguided. In July 2020, Mandi was announced as a brand ambassador for Rihanna's size-inclusive lingerie line, Savage X Fenty. In addition to modeling for the brand's Summer and Valentine's Day ad campaigns, Mandi walked and performed alongside her husband, Miguel, in the Savage X Fenty Show Vol. 2 on October 2, 2020—which premiered on Amazon Prime Video.

Personal life 
At the age of 18, Mandi met singer Miguel on the set of his first music video, "Getcha Hands Up". The two exchanged numbers after Mandi interviewed the singer for a behind-the-scenes promotional DVD. The couple announced their engagement on January 11, 2016, and married on November 24, 2018 at Hummingbird Nest Ranch, in Simi Valley, California. Monique Lhuillier designed her wedding dress. In September 2021, the couple announced their separation, which they called off in January 2022. On October 4, 2022 Mandi filed for divorce citing irreconcilable differences.

In addition to inspiring Miguel's Grammy-winning single, "Adorn", Mandi has stated that her debut single, "FOREVER MOOD", is a reply to Miguel's "All I Want Is You".

Health and activism 
As a young adult, Mandi struggled with body dysmorphia, depression, and anxiety—with panic attacks as part of the latter. She openly discusses overcoming her mental and eating disorder, to help promote self-love and encourage inclusive conversations regarding mental health. In August 2019, Mandi was featured in BET's "Body of Work" segment where she spoke about breaking a diet pill habit and her journey towards healthy weight maintenance. In February 2020, Mandi announced she was becoming a life coach and had plans of developing a new self-empowerment platform.

Filmography

Film

Television

Guest appearances

Commercials

Music videos

Discography

Singles

Music videos

References

External links
 
 Nazanin Mandi on Instagram

Living people
1986 births
People from Valencia, Santa Clarita, California
American people of Iranian descent
American people of Spanish descent
American people who self-identify as being of Native American descent
21st-century American actresses
21st-century American women singers
Female models from California
Hispanic and Latino American models
Actresses of Iranian descent
American actresses of Mexican descent
Actresses from Santa Clarita, California
Singers from California
American musicians of Mexican descent
American Idol participants
21st-century American singers